Forshaw Park is a rugby stadium in Sylvania Waters, New South Wales, Australia.  It is located just 28 km south of the City of Sydney. The ground can hold 2,000 people.

Ground usage
It has been the home ground to the Southern Districts Rugby Club since 1989.

References
 http://www.southerndistricts.com.au/clubfind.html

Rugby league stadiums in Australia
Rugby union stadiums in Australia
Soccer venues in Sydney
Sports venues in Sydney